Isbrueckerichthys duseni is a species of armored catfish endemic to Brazil where it occurs in the Ribeira de Iguape River basin.  This species grows to a length of  SL.

The fish is named in honor of Karl Hjalmar Dusén (1855-1926) a Swedish botanist and explorer, who collected the type specimen.

References 
 

Loricariidae
Taxa named by Alípio de Miranda-Ribeiro
Catfish of South America
Freshwater fish of Brazil
Endemic fauna of Brazil
Fish described in 1907